The Rocket City Trash Pandas are a Minor League Baseball team of the Southern League and the Double-A affiliate of the Los Angeles Angels. They are located in Madison, Alabama, and play their home games at Toyota Field.

History
In November 2017, BallCorps LLC purchased the Southern League's Mobile BayBears from owners Michael Savit and HWS Group for the purpose of relocating the team to Madison, Alabama, in 2020. Upon relocation, the team was renamed the Rocket City Trash Pandas. The name is a reference to both the area's association with the space industry, namely from Huntsville, and the determination and ingenuity of raccoons (which are native to the Huntsville area; "trash panda" is a slang nickname for the animal due to their facial resemblance to the panda and their tendency to dig through trash). In December 2019, Rocket City announced that it had sold more than $2 million in merchandise in just over 13 months since announcing its branding.

The Trash Pandas were to begin their inaugural season on the road playing against the Birmingham Barons on April 9, 2020, and play their first home game on April 15; however, the start of the 2020 season was postponed before getting canceled on June 30 due to the COVID-19 pandemic, pushing back their inaugural season by a year.

In conjunction with Major League Baseball's restructuring of Minor League Baseball in 2021, the Southern League disbanded and the Trash Pandas were organized into the eight-team Double-A South. Their scheduled May 4, 2021, road opener was postponed due to inclement weather, so they played their first game the next night against the Chattanooga Lookouts at AT&T Field in Chattanooga, Tennessee, losing 6–1.

In 2022, the Double-A South became known as the Southern League, the name historically used by the regional circuit prior to the 2021 reorganization. In June, the Trash Pandas won the first half North Division title to clinch a postseason playoff berth. Their first postseason appearance, the Trash Pandas fell to the Tennessee Smokies, 2–1, in the first round of the 2022 Southern League playoffs. Manager Andy Schatzley was chosen for the Southern League Manager of the Year Award, and Chase Silseth won the Southern League Pitcher of the Year Award.

Season-by-season results

Roster

References

External links

Southern League (1964–present) teams
Professional baseball teams in Alabama
Baseball teams established in 2020
2020 establishments in Alabama
Los Angeles Angels minor league affiliates
Raccoons in popular culture
Double-A South teams
Madison County, Alabama